Felixstowe may refer to:

Places
Felixstowe, a seaside town on the North Sea coast of Suffolk, England
Port of Felixstowe, a very large container port in Suffolk, England
Felixstowe Ferry, a hamlet in Suffolk, England

Aircraft
Felixstowe F.2, a British First World War flying boat 
Felixstowe F.3, a British First World War flying boat
Felixstowe F.5, a British First World War flying boat
Felixstowe Fury (serial N123), also known as the Porte Super Baby, was a large British, five-engined triplane flying-boat 
Felixstowe F5L, was one of the Felixstowe F series of flying boats 
Felixstowe Porte Baby, was a British reconnaissance flying boat of the First World War

Royal Navy
RNAS Felixstowe, renamed in 1918 to Seaplane Experimental Station and disbanded in 1919
HMS Felixstowe (J126), was a turbine engined Bangor class minesweeper of the Royal Navy

See also
Felixstow, South Australia, a suburb of Adelaide in the City of Norwood Payneham St Peters